Oziel Hlalele Motaung was a member of the Pan-African Parliament and minister of sports and agriculture from Lesotho.

References

Members of the Pan-African Parliament from Lesotho
Living people
Year of birth missing (living people)
Place of birth missing (living people)